Abba-Zaba is a taffy candy bar with peanut butter center, made by the Annabelle Candy Company in Hayward, California.

According to the Candy Wrapper Museum, the first Abba Zaba bars were manufactured beginning in 1922 by Colby and McDermott. Before Annabelle Candy Co. started manufacturing Abba-Zaba, the packaging featured racially insensitive imagery.  Annabelle Candy Co. will only say that the wrapper has been the same for as long as they have manufactured the candy.

The bar was later manufactured by the Cardinet Candy Co. along with U-No Bar. Annabelle Candy Purchased the Cardinet Candy Co. in 1978. Annabelle now manufactures both candy bars in addition to others.

Abba-Zaba bars can be found almost exclusively west of the Rockies. The wrapper features a yellow and black checkerboard "taxi" pattern. They can be purchased in bulk on the web. They can also be found in candy specialty stores anywhere in the US and Canada.

Recently Annabelle has produced a new Abba-Zaba that has an apple flavored taffy. There is also a new bar that contains chocolate spread instead of peanut butter.

Abba-Zaba bars are kosher pareve.

In popular culture

It is unclear whether any of the following popular culture mentions were paid product placements.

Music

 1960s: The bar was a favorite of rock musician Don Van Vliet, who is best known by his stage name Captain Beefheart. He used the bar's name as a song title on his album Safe as Milk in 1967. Artwork on the rear album sleeve also features a black and yellow checkerboard pattern inspired by the Abba-Zaba wrapper.

 2000s: Fenix TX included a song entitled "Abba Zabba" on their 2001 second album Lechuza.

Television/Series/Streaming

 1970s: On the American satirical soap opera Mary Hartman, Mary Hartman, the character played by Louise Lasser offers her "Survival Training and Existence Therapy -- STET" mentor an Abba-Zaba in episode 74, which aired on April 15, 1976.

Film/Cinema/Movies

 1990s: Abba-Zaba bars are featured prominently in the 1998 Dave Chappelle comedy film Half Baked.

Celebrities

 Actor John Wayne had a sweet tooth and Abba-Zaba bars were his favorite candy.

Actress and TV host Tiffani Thiessen counts the candy bars among her favorite snacks on set while filming episodes of Saved By the Bell.

References

Other sources

External links
Annabellecandy.com - Official website
Candy Wrapper Museum - Earliest known Abba-Zaba box and wrapper

Candy bars
Peanut butter confectionery
Annabelle Candy Company brands